Anjilavand may refer to:
 Anjilavand-e Olya
 Anjilavand-e Sofla